Charles Zwolsman (6 August 1955 – 21 January 2011) was a Dutch drug dealer and professional racecar driver and team owner.

Drug dealing
Zwolsman was born in Oostzaan, and started dealing in marijuana in the 1980s. He built an organization of about 60 people and between 1989 and 1993 alone smuggled at least 44 tonne from Morocco and Spain to Holland and England. Starting in 1994, Zwolsman was arrested multiple times for drug smuggling and money laundering. His final conviction was in a 2010 for possession of 2,000 kilos of hashish and four firearms in 2006. He received a three-year sentence, but died in his cell in Nieuwegein, aged 55, in 2011.

Racing career
Zwolsman competed in the World Sportscar Championship in 1991 finishing 6th overall in the driver standings, running his own team (Euroracing) with a chassis from Spice Engineering. He attempted the series again in 1992 fielding a Lola T92/10, but failed to score a point. However his Euroracing team finished 5th in the championship. The series folded the next year. He competed from 1990 to 1992 in the 24 Hours of Le Mans, having his best result in 1992 when he teamed with Heinz-Harald Frentzen and Shunji Kasuya to finish 13th. In 1992 he also competed in the Interserie, winning one race and finishing 10th in the drivers' standings. Zwolsman's son Charles Jr. would follow his father into motorsports, also competing in Le Mans as well as Formula Three and Champ Car.

24 Hours of Le Mans Result

References

1955 births
2011 deaths
Dutch drug traffickers
20th-century Dutch criminals
21st-century Dutch criminals
24 Hours of Le Mans drivers
Dutch racing drivers
World Sportscar Championship drivers
People from Oostzaan
Sportspeople from North Holland
People convicted of illegal possession of weapons
Auto racing controversies

pt:Charles Zwolsman